Logje is a small settlement in the Municipality of Kobarid in the Littoral region of Slovenia. It includes the hamlets of Brežani, Vrhovci, Rosi, and Končanjani.

Geography

Logje is a clustered village in the Breginj Combe on a semicircular slope above a broad terrace over the Nadiža River below Sleme Hill (598 m). It is connected by a road to Breginj that leads through undulating plateaus and then descends steeply to the terrace, where it continues to Robidišče. The fields are divided into small parcels and there are also hay fields and pastures. Below the village, Jamjak and Parivnjak creeks empty into the Nadiža. There are also several springs below the village. South of the village, a trail crosses a stone bridge known as the Napoleon Bridge and then continues south to the Pradolino dry valley (or Predol), and then on to Stupizza, where it meets the Nadiža once again.

History
After the Second World War, 70 people from the village emigrated to Argentina, Australia, Germany, and France, leaving many of the houses in the village empty.

Church

The church in the settlement is dedicated to Saints Primus and Felicianus.

References

External links

Logje on Geopedia

Populated places in the Municipality of Kobarid